Helicia maxwelliana is a plant in the family Proteaceae. The twigs are dark brown. The flowers are reddish brown. H. maxwelliana is endemic to Borneo.

References

maxwelliana
Plants described in 1914
Endemic flora of Borneo